The Macintosh Quadra 950 (also sold with additional software as the Workgroup Server 95) is a personal computer designed, manufactured and sold by Apple Computer from March 1992 to October 1995. The two computers were otherwise identical, including the price. With a Macintosh Processor Upgrade Card installed, this computer is known as the Power Macintosh 950.

In 1993, the 950 was overtaken in performance by the less expensive Quadra 800 and 840AV. The newer Quadras had the addition of interleaved RAM, as well as an enhanced video system and SCSI bus. However, their more compact (mini-tower) case offered less expansion capability, so the 950 (due to its mid-tower case allowing 6 slots to be supported) was kept in continued production for the server market, outliving the 800 and 840AV. Also, the Quadra 800 was not capable of operating at 24-bit color, regardless of how much VRAM is installed or whether an external video card is used, while the Quadra 900 and 950 were capable of 24-bit color.

The Quadra 950 was replaced by the PowerPC-based Power Macintosh 9500 in May 1995, with sales continuing until October. It was the last Macintosh Quadra sold by Apple, and one of the last 68k models to be discontinued, due to its high RAM capacity and large number of NuBus slots.  The Workgroup Server 95 was succeeded by the Workgroup Server 9150.

Hardware 

The logic board has five NuBus slots and a Processor Direct Slot, but due to the positioning of the PDS it is not possible to use one of the NuBus slots when a PDS card is installed.  The NuBus-90 standard is partially supported, allowing for cards to run at 20 MHz, and two of the slots provide 25 watts of power instead of the usual 15 watts.

The logic board has 1 MB of on-board video RAM, with 4 SIMM slots that allow for upgrading to 2 MB.

The 950 includes a key to limit access to various subsystems depending on the computer's use environment. The key switch has three positions labelled OFF, ON and SECURE. The OFF position immediately cuts the power and prevented the computer from being powered on. The ON position allows the computer to operate normally. The SECURE position was intended for use as a server – power was always applied in this position. If the computer lost power, it immediately starts up when power was restored. Also, this position disables the keyboard, mouse and floppy disk drive.

The Workgroup Server 95 models include the "Workgroup Server PDS Card", which provides three capabilities:  Two SCSI controllers with two internal SCSI connectors (plus one external connector); a DMS SCSI control chip that reduces I/O load on the main CPU; and 128 KB of SRAM which is used as an L2 cache.  There are three additional slots that provide the ability further expand the L2 cache to 512 KB.

Models 
The Quadra 950 was announced on March 18, with dealers receiving machines around May 18.

Introduced May 18, 1992:
 Macintosh Quadra 950: 33 MHz 68040 CPU. $7,200 for a floppy drive only model, $8,499 with a 230 MB HDD, and $9,199 with a 400 MB HDD. 8 MB of memory was standard everywhere except for some European countries, where the standard included memory was 4 MB.
Introduced March 22, 1993:
 Workgroup Server 95:  Sold in several configurations, all of which include a 33 MHz 68040 CPU and a PDS card containing a fast SCSI connection.  In the United States, the configurations were split into "File and Print", and "Database" configurations:
 File/Print: 16 MB RAM, 230 MB HDD, 128 KB L2 cache.  $7,589.
 File/Print: 16 MB RAM, 500 MB HDD, DDS-DC digital tape drive, 256 KB L2 cache. $10,039.
 File/Print: 32 MB RAM, 1000 MB HDD, DDS-DC digital tape drive, AppleShare Pro, 512 KB L2 cache. $12,839.
 Database: 32 MB RAM, 230 MB and 500 MB HDDs, DDS-DC digital tape drive, 256 KB L2 cache. $11,319.
 Database: 48 MB RAM, 230 MB and 1000 MB HDDs, DDS-DC digital tape drive, 512 KB L2 cache. $12,929.

Specifications 
 Processor: 33 MHz Motorola 68040
 Processor Cache: 8 KB Level 1
 Bus Speed: 33 MHz
 Hard Drive: 230 MB - 1 GB
 Media drives: 1.44 MB floppy drive, optional DDS-DC drive (Workgroup Server 95)
 Software: Mac OS 7.1 - 8.1
 Logicboard RAM: None
 Maximum RAM: 256 MB
 Type of RAM: 30-pin SIMM (16 slots)
 Minimum RAM Speed: 80 ns
 Interleaving Support: No
 Graphics: Integrated
 Display Connection: DB-15
 Graphics Memory: 1 MB standard, upgradable to 2 MB via 4 VRAM slots
 Expansion Slots: 5 - NuBus, 1 - PDS
 Hard Drive Bus: SCSI
 Backup Battery: 3.6 V Lithium
 Max Watts: 303 W
 Ports: AAUI-15 Ethernet, 1 ADB, DB-25 SCSI, 2 Serial, 3.5-mm mono input jack, 3.5-mm stereo output jack

References

External links

 EveryMac.com Quadra 950 Specs
 Quadra 950 at Lowendmac

950
Quadra 950
Quadra 950
Quadra 950
Computer-related introductions in 1992

it:Macintosh Quadra 950